Folly Seeing All This is a 1993 album by Michael Mantler.

Reception
The AllMusic review by Peter Nappi stated: "At once melodic and challenging, Folly Seeing All This is experimental chamber jazz at its most enjoyable".

Track listing

LP release

Side A

 Folly Seeing All This - 28:44

Side B

 News - 11:31
 What Is the Word - 4:37

CD Release

 Folly Seeing All This - 28:44
 News - 11:31
 What Is the Word - 4:37

Personnel

Michael Mantler - Trumpet
Rick Fenn - Electric guitar (Listed in the liner notes only as guitar)
Wolfgang Puschnig - Alto flute
Karen Mantler - Piano, vocals on "What is the Word"
Dave Adams - Vibraphone, chimes
Samuel Beckett - words to "What is the Word"
Jack Bruce - Vocals on "What is the Word"

The Balanescu string quartet

Alexander Balanescu - Violin
Clare Connors - Violin
Bill Hawkes - Viola
Jane Fenton - Cello

References

1993 albums
ECM Records albums
Michael Mantler albums